Oclemena nemoralis, common names bog aster or bog nodding aster, is a plant native to the northeastern United States. Its range extends into southeastern Canada.

Conservation status
It is listed as endangered in Connecticut  and Pennsylvania.

Native American ethnobotany
The Ojibwe use a decoction of root as drops or on a compress for sore ears.

References

Plants used in traditional Native American medicine
Astereae
Flora of the Northeastern United States
Flora of Eastern Canada
Flora without expected TNC conservation status